The Gay Pride Community Building (Spanish: Edificio Comunidad de Orgullo Gay de Puerto Rico), also known as Casa Orgullo ("Pride House"), is a historic site and former LGBT community center located in Río Piedras Pueblo (downtown Río Piedras) in San Juan, Puerto Rico. 

The building, a two-story reinforced concrete, Mediterranean Revival apartment house, first served as a meeting hall for the first gay/lesbian organization established in Puerto Rico, founded in 1974 as Comunidad de Orgullo Gay (Gay Pride Community). Inspired by the 1969 Stonewall Revolt, this was the first organized attempt to confront social, political and legal discrimination against the local LGBTQ community by pioneering resistance to discrimination through political action, educational programs, public awareness and social support to the community.

Although Comunidad de Orgullo Gay disbanded in 1976, Casa Orgullo remains a symbol of gay rights in Puerto Rico, and it is considered a social historic site due to its importance in spearheading the gay liberation movement in the island. Forty years later, the building was listed in the National Register of Historic Places on May 2, 2016.

The building is not open to the public, but it hosts a mural titled Flor de Parcha which depicts passion fruit flowers and can be appreciated from the street.

See also 
 LGBT rights in Puerto Rico

References 

1974 establishments in Puerto Rico
Cultural history of Puerto Rico
LGBT history in North America
National Register of Historic Places in San Juan, Puerto Rico
Mediterranean Revival architecture
LGBT community centres
LGBT in Puerto Rico
Organizations established in 1974
Apartment buildings on the National Register of Historic Places
Residential buildings on the National Register of Historic Places in Puerto Rico